Dispersal index is a parameter in volcanology. The dispersal index  was defined by George P. L. Walker in 1973 as the surface area covered by an ash or tephra fall, where the thickness is equal or more than 1/100 of the thickness of the fall at the vent. An eruption with a low dispersal index leaves most of its products close to the vent, forming a cone; an eruption with a high dispersal index forms thinner sheet-like deposits which extends to larger distances from the vent. Likewise, a dispersal index of  has been proposed as a cutoff for an ultraplinian eruption. The definition of 1/100 of the near-vent thickness was partially dictated by the fact that most tephra deposits are not well preserved at larger distances.

Originally, the dispersal index was considered a function of the height of the eruption column. Later, a role for the size of the tephra and ash particles was identified, with coarser fall deposits covering smaller surfaces than finer deposits generated by a column of the same height. Thus, Walker's idea of the column height alone separating a cone forming eruption and an eruption generating a sheet-like deposit was later considered oversimplified. An additional complicating factor is that fine particles are prone to aggregating and thus falling out more quickly from the column. Further problems arise when the maximum thickness has to be determined.

The height of the eruption column, the presence and behaviour of water, the speed and direction of the wind as well as the sizes of the various tephra particles influence the fallout patterns of an ash cloud.

A related measure is the thickness half-distance , which defines the distance over which the thickness of a deposit halves.

References

Sources 

 
 
 
 

Volcanology
Tephra